Ramamoorthy Ramesh (born 1960) is an American materials scientist of Indian descent who has contributed to the synthesis, assembly and understanding of complex functional oxides, such as ferroelectric materials. In particular, he has worked on the development of ferroelectric perovskites, manganites with colossal magnetoresistance, and also on multiferroic oxides with potential benefits for modern information technologies.

He is a professor at the University of California Berkeley in the Department of Materials Science and Engineering, and Physics.

Training and career 
He joined Lawrence Berkeley National Laboratory in 2004 as a Faculty Scientist and became Associate Laboratory Director (ALD) for Energy Technologies in 2014 with three Divisions focused on Energy Technologies. After serving in the role for a few years, he assumed his role as Professor at the University of California, Berkeley. Ramesh served as the founding Director of DOE's SunShot Initiative and subsequently he also served in a leadership position at Oak Ridge National Laboratory.

Awards and honors
 2020 Elected Foreign Member of the Royal Society.
 2014 FMD John Bardeen Award of TMS
 2012 Distinguished Alumnus Award, Indian Institute of Science Alumni Association
 2011 Elected member, United States National Academy of Engineering
 2010 James C. McGroddy Prize for New Materials of the American Physical Society (together with Nicola A. Spaldin and Sang-Wook Cheong)
 2009 Materials Research Society Fellow
 2007 Materials Research Society David Turnbull Lectureship
 C.K. Majumdar Lectureship Award, Bose Institute, Calcutta, India
 2006 Brahm Prakash Chair, Indian Institute of Science, Bangalore, India
 2005 Fellow, American Association for the Advancement of Science
 2005 American Physical Society Adler Lectureship
 2003 Distinguished University Professor, University of Maryland, College Park
 2001 Fellow, American Physical Society
 2001 Alexander von Humboldt Senior Scientist Prize

External links 
 Homepage at LBL
 Ramamoorthy Ramesh at Google Scholar

References

1960 births
Living people
American materials scientists
University of California, Berkeley alumni
University of Maryland, College Park faculty
University of California, Berkeley faculty
Indian Institute of Science alumni
Foreign Members of the Royal Society
Fellows of the American Physical Society